Photopsia is the presence of perceived flashes of light in the field of vision. 

It is most commonly associated with:

 posterior vitreous detachment
 migraine aura (ocular migraine / retinal migraine)
 migraine aura without headache
 scintillating scotoma
 retinal break or detachment
 occipital lobe infarction (similar to occipital stroke)
 sensory deprivation (ophthalmopathic hallucinations)
 age-related macular degeneration
 vertebrobasilar insufficiency 
 optic neuritis
 visual snow syndrome

Vitreous shrinkage or liquefaction, which are the most common causes of photopsia, cause a pull in vitreoretinal attachments, irritating the retina and causing it to discharge electrical impulses. These impulses are interpreted by the brain as flashes.

This condition has also been identified as a common initial symptom of punctate inner choroiditis (PIC), a rare retinal autoimmune disease believed to be caused by the immune system mistakenly attacking and destroying the retina.  During pregnancy, new-onset photopsia is concerning for severe preeclampsia.

Photopsia can present as retinal detachment when examined by an optometrist or ophthalmologist. However, it can also be a sign of uveal melanoma.  This condition is extremely rare (5–7 per 1 million people will be affected, typically fair-skinned, blue-eyed northern Europeans). Photopsia should be investigated immediately.

Causes 
Several conditions affecting the eyes can cause photopsia to occur. The underlying condition must be identified and treated to resolve the symptoms.

Peripheral (posterior) vitreous detachment 
Peripheral (posterior) vitreous detachment occurs when the gel around the eye separates from the retina. This can naturally occur with age. However, if it occurs too rapidly, it can cause photopsia which manifests in flashes and floaters in the vision. Typically, the flashes and floaters go away in a few months.

Retinal detachment 
The retina lines the inside of the eye. It is light-sensitive and communicates visual messages to the brain. If the retina detaches, it moves and shifts from its normal position. This can cause photopsia, but can also cause permanent vision loss. Medical attention is needed to prevent vision loss. Procedures may include laser treatment, freezing, or surgery.

Age-related macular degeneration 
Age-related macular degeneration (AMD) is a common eye condition among people aged 50 and older. The macula is a part of the eye that helps you see sharply straight ahead. With AMD, the macula slowly deteriorates which can cause photopsia.

Ocular (retinal) migraine / Migraine aura 
Migraines are a type of recurring headache. Migraines typically cause severe pain in the head, but can also cause visual changes known as auras. Migraines can also cause visual snow.

Optic neuritis 
Optic neuritis is an inflammation that damages the optic nerve. It’s linked to multiple sclerosis (MS). Along with flickering or flashing with eye movement, symptoms include pain, loss of colour perception, and vision loss.

Occipital lobe infarction (stroke) or ischemia 
The occipital lobe is one of four lobes in the brain. It controls the ability to see things. Impaired blood flow to the cells of the occipital lobe (ischemia, for example as caused by a TIA or Vertebrobasilar insufficiency) will lead to temporary visual problems; if the poor blood flow is sustained it will lead to cell death (infarction, for example as caused by a stroke) which may cause persistent visual problems.

The main symptoms associated with an occipital lobe infarction involve changes to vision such as:

 blurry vision
 blindness, which may affect part of vision only
 hallucinations, such as flashing lights (photopsia): usually only in the context of blindness

Sensory deprivation (Ophthalmopathic hallucinations) 
Sensory deprivation or ophthalmopathic hallucination are hallucinations that appear in the field of vision.

Appearance 
Photopsias is defined as an effect on the vision that causes appearances of anomalies in the vision. Photopsias usually appear as:

 flickering lights
 shimmering lights
 floating shapes
 moving dots
snow or static

Photopsias are not generally a condition on their own, but a symptom of another condition.

See also
 Fortification spectra
 Moore's lightning streaks
 Infarction
Sensory deprivation
Vertebrobasilar insufficiency

References

 Engmann, Birk (2008). "Phosphenes and photopsias – ischaemic origin or sensorial deprivation? – Case history." Z. Neuropsychol. 19(1): 7–13.   
 Chu, David S. (MD) (2001). Ocular Immunology and Uveitis Foundation.  https://web.archive.org/web/20160304061225/http://www.uveitis.org/docs/dm/punctate_inner_choroiditis.pdf
 Sihota, Ramanjit. Tandon, Radhika.(2011). Parsons' Disease of the Eye.  2011. Edition 21st. pp. 90–91. 

Eye diseases
Medical signs
Migraine
Hallucinations